Justice Somerville or Sommerville may refer to:

Henderson M. Somerville, associate justice of the Alabama Supreme Court
Ormond Somerville (I), associate justice of the Alabama Supreme Court
Ormond Somerville (II), associate justice of the Alabama Supreme Court
Walter B. Sommerville, associate justice of the Louisiana Supreme Court